Pelton railway station served the village of Pelton, County Durham, England, from 1860 to 1955 on the Stanhope and Tyne Railway.

History 
The first station opened in 1860 by the North Eastern Railway. It was only used for recreational journeys on Saturdays only after 6pm but this disappeared from the timetables in June 1869. The second station opened on 1 February 1894. The station building was on the northbound platform and the signal box was on the southbound platform. The goods yard was behind the station building platform which had a small goods shed and three sidings. The station closed on 23 May 1955.

Accidents 
On 21 April 1906, a deputy overman opened his door in an attempt to jump to the platform while the train was still moving. Despite passengers telling him not to, he did it anyway and was trapped between the footboard and the platform. The footboard had to be sawn to retrieve his corpse.

References

External links 

Disused railway stations in County Durham
Former North Eastern Railway (UK) stations
Railway stations in Great Britain opened in 1860
Railway stations in Great Britain closed in 1869
Railway stations in Great Britain opened in 1894
Railway stations in Great Britain closed in 1955
1860 establishments in England
1955 disestablishments in England
1894 establishments in England